"Heartless" is a song by American producer Diplo featuring American country singer Morgan Wallen. It was released through Mad Decent and Columbia Records on August 16, 2019. The music video was directed by Brandon Dermer and premiered on September 5, 2019.

Background
"Heartless" is a part of Diplo's first "country project" and album Chapter 1: Snake Oil where he collaborated with many different artists, creating songs with a mashup of trap, pop, country, and dance/electronic music. The album was released on May 29, 2020. Writing credits were given to Diplo, Wallen, King Henry, Ryan Vojtesak, Ernest Keith Smith, and Ryan Hurd.

A few of Diplo's managers reached out to Seth England, who is Wallen's manager, along with Florida Georgia Line and Chris Lane. Diplo and Wallen did not even meet until the making of the music video.

Commercial performance
"Heartless" was certified Gold by the RIAA on November 19, 2019,  Platinum on 12 February 2020, and double Platinum on June 16, 2020 for 2 million units in sales and streams. The song has sold 73,000 copies in the United States as of March 2020.

Music video
The music video for "Heartless" was released onto YouTube on September 5, 2019. In the video, Wallen and Diplo are seen exploring Atlantic City. In the beginning, the camera shifts from the men playing games at a carnival to them singing on the beach and boardwalk. Later the pair is seen getting in a car where they are taken to a casino, when finally, they are performing a concert on stage for a crowd until the ending where the two share a hug.

Charts

Weekly charts

Year-end charts

Certifications

Julia Michaels version

A re-recorded version of the song featuring American singer Julia Michaels was released on January 31, 2020. A second video clip was released on the same day. The video was filmed in Nashville and again, directed by Brandon Dermer. The clip takes place at a motel where Wallen and Michaels appear to be having issues in their respective relationships. When both of them step outside for fresh air, they ditch their lovers and run away together. The remix impacted pop radio in the US on February 25, 2020.

Music video
The alternate music video with Julia Michaels was released to YouTube on January 31, 2020. In the video, both Wallen and Michaels are seen at the same motel, both with a significant other. First, Michaels is seen having trouble connecting with her man, as he shrugs her off when she attempts to put her head on his shoulder. It then shifts to Wallen who is also seen having the same trouble with his girl, as she shrugs him away when he attempts to put his arm around her. After a few shots of them singing in their rooms, they both then walk out of the door and lean on the walls next to each other, where they share a smile and a nod. They both go back in to pack their bags. Finally they both meet outside to get in Wallen's truck and drive off where the video comes to an end.

Charts

Wallen Album Mix

Wallen released a solo re-recorded version of the song in August 2020. A studio video was released several days later. This version of the song was solely produced by Joey Moi and instrumentally changed to sound like country music. It was included on Wallen's sophomore album Dangerous: The Double Album.

Critical reception
Wes Langeler of Whiskey Riff called the album mix "way better than the original", crediting the production choices and highlighting the use of real drums, banjos, slide guitar, and the mandolin.

References

2019 songs
2019 singles
2020 singles
Diplo songs
Morgan Wallen songs
Julia Michaels songs
Columbia Records singles
Song recordings produced by Diplo
Song recordings produced by Joey Moi
Songs written by Diplo
Songs written by King Henry (producer)
Songs written by Morgan Wallen
Trap music songs
Songs written by Ryan Hurd
Songs written by Ernest (musician)